Season twenty-four of the television program American Experience originally aired on the PBS network in the United States on January 10, 2012 and concluded on September 18, 2012.  The season contained eight new episodes and began with the film Billy the Kid.

Episodes

References

2012 American television seasons
American Experience